Bradwell is a village in the Canadian province of Saskatchewan within the Rural Municipality of Blucher No. 343 and Census Division No. 11. The village is located about 36 km southeast of the City of Saskatoon on Highway 763. In 1936, during gravel excavations for a highway, the partial skeleton of a neolithic human male were discovered and named "Bradwell Man". A stone scraper and some eagle talons were found nearby.

History 

Bradwell incorporated as a village on December 26, 1912.

Demographics 

See also
 List of communities in Saskatchewan
 Villages of Saskatchewan

References

Villages in Saskatchewan
Blucher No. 343, Saskatchewan
Division No. 11, Saskatchewan